Bruno Miguel da Cunha Sousa Oliveira Mendes (born 15 March 1976 in Carregado, Lisbon) is a Portuguese retired footballer who played as a central defender.

Club career
After making his Primeira Liga debut in the 1998–99 season with S.C. Campomaiorense, which folded soon after, Mendes moved to Rio Ave FC, going on to play in the club for nearly a decade and becoming one of the players with most matches in the Vila do Conde side's all-time list with more than 150 overall, only behind Evandro and Niquinha.

In the 2008–09 campaign, after helping Rio Ave to a top flight promotion, Mendes was an undisputed defensive starter, partnering former FC Porto's Gaspar in the middle and scoring in a 2–4 home loss against Vitória de Guimarães on 3 January 2009.

In 2009–10, Rio Ave again managed to retain their top division status, but he only contributed with two games, retiring at the end of the season aged 34.

References

External links

1976 births
Living people
Portuguese footballers
Association football defenders
Primeira Liga players
Liga Portugal 2 players
Segunda Divisão players
S.C. Campomaiorense players
Rio Ave F.C. players
People from Alenquer
Sportspeople from Lisbon District